Ng Cheuk Wai (born 19 March 1997) is a Hongkonger footballer who plays as a goalkeeper for Hong Kong Women League club Happy Valley AA. She is also a futsal player, and represented Hong Kong internationally in both football and futsal.

International career
Ng Cheuk Wai has been capped for Hong Kong at senior level in both football and futsal. In football, she represented Hong Kong at the 2013 AFC U-16 Women's Championship qualification, the 2015 AFC U-19 Women's Championship qualification, two EAFF E-1 Football Championship editions (2017 and 2019), the 2018 AFC Women's Asian Cup qualification, the 2018 Asian Games and the 2020 AFC Women's Olympic Qualifying Tournament.

In futsal, Ng Cheuk Wai played for Hong Kong at two AFC Women's Futsal Championship editions (2015 and 2018).

See also
List of Hong Kong women's international footballers

References

1997 births
Living people
Hong Kong women's futsal players
Hong Kong women's footballers
Women's association football goalkeepers
Hong Kong women's international footballers